Hatchapaloo Creek is a stream in the U.S. state of Mississippi. It is a tributary to Oakohay Creek.

Hatchapaloo is a name derived from the Choctaw language purported to mean either "creek where fish are caught" or "creek consisting of two branches". A variant name is "Hatchapalog Creek".

References

Rivers of Mississippi
Rivers of Simpson County, Mississippi
Rivers of Smith County, Mississippi
Mississippi placenames of Native American origin